Tolbazy is the name of two rural localities in the Republic of Bashkortostan, Russia:
Tolbazy, Aurgazinsky District, Republic of Bashkortostan, a selo in Aurgazinsky District
Tolbazy, Kushnarenkovsky District, Republic of Bashkortostan, a village in Kushnarenkovsky District